"Ya nada queda" is a pop song performed by Kudai. It was released as the second single of their debut album, Vuelo (2004). There is an English version of the song, titled "It's Over (Ya nada queda)".

Music video
The music video for this song was released on 28 October 2004. The music video was premiered on Zona Latina music channel of Chile. Later premiered on MTV.

Charts

References

External links 
Kudai Official Site
EMI Music Mexico

2004 songs
2005 singles
Kudai songs
EMI Records singles